Stephen Thorndike is a high school teacher. He is known for discovering, along with astrophysicist Alice C. Quillen, Epsilon Eridani c, a hypothetical planet orbiting the star Epsilon Eridani. After working at the University of Rochester, he now works as a science instructional specialist at Monroe 2 Boces in Spencerport, New York.

References

21st-century American physicists
Year of birth missing (living people)
Living people
People from Greece, New York
Scientists from New York (state)